Veritas was the Roman goddess of truth, and is the Latin word for "truth". It is used as the motto of a number of organizations.

Veritas may also refer to:

Media

Books 

Veritas (manhwa), written by Kim Dong-hoon and illustrated by Yoon Joon-shik
Veritas, a historical novel by Monaldi & Sorti
 "Veritas", a 2002 short story by Robert Reed

Music 
 Veritas (band), an American classical vocal group
 Veritas (Agnes album), 2012
 Veritas (Gary Hughes album) or the title song, 2007
 Veritas (Veritas album), 2014
 Veritas, an album by the Alex Skolnick Trio, 2011

Film, television, and audio 
 "Veritas" (Castle)
 "Veritas" (CSI: NY)
 "Veritas" (Sanctuary)
 "Veritas" (Smallville)
 "Veritas" (Star Trek: Lower Decks)
 Veritas, Prince of Truth, a 2007 film
 Veritas: The Quest, a 2003 American television series
 Veritas, a text in the Doctor Who episode "Extremis"
 Veritas, a character in the Sarah Jane Adventures audio story "Judgement Day"

Organisations and corporations
 Veritas (automobile), German post-WW2 sports and racing car manufacturer
 Veritas (political party), a defunct British political party
 Bureau Veritas, an international certification agency
 Det Norske Veritas, a standards organization for maritime construction
 Project Veritas, U.S. far-right activist group
 Veritas Academy, Florida
 Veritas Academy (Austin, Texas)
 Veritas AG, a German corporation of automotive parts, based in Gelnhausen, Germany
 Veritas Capital, a New York-based private-equity firm
 Veritas Christian Academy, a private school in North Carolina, USA
 Veritas Communications, publishing company of the Irish Catholic Bishops' Conference
 Veritas Forum, Christian organization
 Veritas Technologies, a software corporation
 Veritas Tools, a Canadian manufacturer of woodworking tools
 Veritas, publishing company of the Australian League of Rights
 Veritas of Washington, a consulting company in Washington, D.C., that once managed United Medical Center

Science and technology
 490 Veritas, an asteroid
 VERITAS, a high-energy astrophysics telescope in southern Arizona
 VERITAS (spacecraft), a planned spacecraft mission to Venus
 Veritas File System, for storing and organizing digital data

Other uses
 Veritas (Scots law), a defense to defamation under Scots law
 Veritas Stadion, a football stadium in Turku, Finland
 Operation Veritas, 2001 UK military operations against the Taliban government of Afghanistan